George Hughes, also known as Kwesi Afedzi, is a Ghanaian-born American artist specializing in painting, poetry and performance art.

Early life and education 
Hughes received his master's degree in art education at The College of Art, Kwame Nkrumah University of Science and Technology, Kumasi (1992). He received his Master of Fine Arts in painting at Bowling Green State University, Bowling Green, Ohio (2001).

Career 
Hughes' paintings and performance art works have been exhibited internationally in Europe, Africa and America. His work references violence and tragedy of colonialism juxtaposed with contemporary global conflicts. His performance art works are interdisciplinary, combining ritual, poetry, sound effects, video, and allegorical configurations. His large paintings feature human and animal body parts combined with commercial signage and global symbols. His two dimensional works are assemblages often incorporating toys and small robots. 

He is represented in Switzerland, Germany, Luxemburg, and Austria by Artco Gallery based in Herzogenrath, Germany.
In Portugal he is affiliated with Influx Contemporary Art Gallery, based in lisbon, Portugal.
In Africa he is represented by Artists Alliance Gallery, located in Accra, Ghana.

References

http://www.invaluable.com/auction-lot/george-hughes-kwesi-afedzi-,-ghana-b.1962-1-c-bip5uao4fw
Helmut Anheier, Yudhishthir Raj Isar, “Cultural Expression, Creativity & Innovation” (2010) pgs 62–77
Holland, Cotter, “New York Times”, Museums and Gallery Listings (5/18/10)
Jegede, dele, “Encyclopaedia of African American Art” (2009), pp. 109–112
Kaiser, Franz, “Museum Paper” (9/29/01) pg 2
“New American Paintings” magazine (8/98)
Svasek Maruska (2007). Anthropology, Art and Cultural Production., pp. 116–122. Pluto Press, London. 
Doran Ross (2001). African Arts, Volume 34., pp. 50–57. University of California, Los Angeles. (ISSN 0001-9933)
http://www.artnet.com/artists/lotdetailpage.aspx?lot_id=C17CB54222CE0949C49D442D56923FF5
http://www.gohughes.com/
http://visualstudies.buffalo.edu/people/hughes/bio.html

1962 births
Living people
Artists from New York (state)
American art educators
Bowling Green State University alumni